LSM Education  (formerly known as London School of Marketing) is a private business school based in London, United Kingdom. It offers professional and academic qualifications, including level-5 and level-7 diplomas and short courses. LSM Educations's head office is in Victoria, Central London. The school also has offices in Dubai, China, Sri Lanka and a network of Local Access Points (LAPs) from around the world.

History
LSM Education was founded as London School of Marketing in 2002, by Paul Penman, Director. It began by providing programmes through The Chartered Institute of Marketing (CIM). It now also offers undergraduate and postgraduate diplomas validated by partner higher education institutions and awarding bodies, such as Qualifi and EduQual.

Organisation and administration

Offices and locations
The main LSM Education building is at 9 Devonshire Square, Central London with further offices in China, Colombo, Sri Lanka and has its LAPs across various countries like West Africa, India, etc.

Ownership
LSM Education is a private company limited by guarantee and part of the LS Education Group.

Academics

Accreditations
LSM Education is a BAC accredited online, distance and blended learning provider.

Programmes
The following courses are currently on offer:

Pathway programmes

Qualifi Diplomas
Diploma in Business Management
Diploma in Business Enterprise
Diploma in Executive Management
Diploma in Strategic Management and Leadership
Diploma in Accounting and Finance
Diploma in Human Resource Management

EduQual Diplomas
Diploma in Business and Marketing Management
Diploma in Business Management
Diploma in Accounting and Finance
Diploma in Business and Marketing Strategy
Diploma in Human Resource Management

External links
 LSM Education official website

References

Education in London